The Bordered White Banner was one of the Eight Banners of Manchu military and society during the Later Jin and Qing dynasty of China. It was among the lower five banners.

Members
 Liugiya Cuiyan (1866–1925), Secondary consort (1866–1925), of the Manchu Bordered White Banner Liugiya clan, personal name Cuiyan, was a consort of Yixuan. She was 26 years his junior.
 Kathy Chow, is a Hong Kong actress who is widely known for her leading roles in Hong Kong TVB series during the late 1980s to 1990s. She is  descended from the Gūwalgiya clan of the Bordered White Banner.
 Akdun (阿克敦) Styled: Lixuan (May 4, 1685- February 22, 1756) was an official of the Qing Dynasty. He was a member of the Janggiya (章佳) clan 
 Zaiyi  better known by his title Prince Duan (or Prince Tuan), best known as one of the leaders of the Boxer Rebellion of 1899–1901. Zaiyi was born in the Aisin Gioro clan as the second son of Yicong (Prince Dun), the fifth son of the Daoguang Emperor

Notable clans 

 Gūwalgiya
 Liugiya
 Janggiya
 Mu'ercai
 Tunggiya

References

 

Bordered White Bannermen
Bordered White Banner